Get Big is the second studio album by American rapper Dorrough, released on September 7, 2010. The album sold 5,500 copies during its first week. The album sold 18,000 copies in the United States.

Singles
 The album lead single "Hood Bitch Fetish" featuring Yo Gotti, was released on April 27, 2010.
 The album's title track and second single "Get Big", was released on June 8, 2010.

Promotion singles
 The album's promotional single "I Want (Hood Christmas Anthem)", was released on December 3, 2009.
 The album's second promotional single "Number 23", was released on January 26, 2009.

Track listing

References 

2010 albums
Dorrough albums
E1 Music albums
Albums produced by Drumma Boy
Albums produced by Shawty Redd
Albums produced by DJ Toomp
Albums produced by Fatboi
Albums produced by JellyRoll